The Global Young Academy is an international society of young  scientists, aiming to give a voice to young scientists across the globe.

Membership strength is capped at 200, and the membership tenure is 5 years.

Organization and membership
The Global Young Academy (GYA) aims to be the "Voice for Young Scientists" and encourages international, intergenerational, and interdisciplinary collaboration and dialogue.

The GYA has working groups on science education, science and society, early career development, and interdisciplinary issues.

The typical age of members is approximately 35 years old; members are expected to be several years past their doctoral studies. The number of members is capped at 200, and each scientist is limited to a five-year term of membership. Memberships are offered based on scientific excellence, after a process of nominations from senior scientists, national societies, and self-nominations, together with peer review by members. The GYA reached its full capacity of 200 members in 2014. In addition, there are 258 alumni. As of 2019, 83 countries are represented at the GYA.

The office of the GYA is hosted at the German National Academy of Sciences Leopoldina in Halle (Saale), Germany.

History
The Global Young Academy was founded in 2010 in Berlin, Germany, after a preliminary organizational meeting in 2008 sponsored by the InterAcademy Panel on International Issues and the World Economic Forum and a second organizational meeting in 2009 in Dalian, China. Its founding co-chairs are Gregory Weiss, a chemist from the University of California, Irvine, United States, and Nitsara Karoonuthaisiri from the National Center for Genetic Engineering and Biotechnology in Thailand. The outgoing (2018) co-chairs are Drs. Tolu Oni, University of Cape Town, South Africa, and Connie Nshemereirwe, Actualise Africa, Uganda. The current (2019) co-chairs are Drs. Connie Nshemereirwe and Koen Vermeir.

The GYA cooperates closely with most major scientific organizations around the world such as UNESCO, the UN Secretary General's Scientific Advisory Board, ISC (formerly ICSU), IAP, the Global Research Council, the European Commission's Joint Research Centre and The World Academy of Sciences (TWAS). The GYA is active in helping establish national young academies around the world. In 2017, three national young academies were launched in Albania, Estonia, and Finland. The GYA also developed several international research projects and campaigns in recent years. Recently, the GYA was invited to join the advisory board of the UN Major Group for Children and Youth (UN MGCY). Since 2019, the GYA has been named a full member of the InterAcademy Partnership (IAP), the global network of 138 academies of science, engineering and medicine.

Goals
The academy aims to bring together young scientists to solve global problems and policy issues that require interdisciplinary expertise, encourage young people to enter scientific careers, promote a scientific culture in which excellence in research is more highly valued than seniority, and improve the foundations of science worldwide by providing encouragement and recognition to researchers in countries with underdeveloped national scientific programs.

One particular focus of the GYA is facilitating the growth of the global network of (national) young academies around the world. The GYA has actively aided the establishment of national young academies around the world. For example, Indian National Young Academy of Sciences, New Delhi was established in 2015 in lines with GYA. Since 2010, around 36 national young academies have been established. As of 2019, there are 41 national young academies, and more than 10 similar bodies around the world. More are close to launching in 2019.

Notable members

Olanike Adeyemo
Ghada Bassioni
Noble Banadda
Tilman Brück
Sophie Carenco
Eqbal Dauqan
Bilge Demirköz
Saeid Esmaeilzadeh
Michal Feldman
Rajesh Gopakumar
Ingrid Johnsrude
Nathalie Katsonis
Yamuna Krishnan
Xuelong Li
Yueh-Lin Loo
Ernesto Lupercio
Sandra McLaren
Hiba Mohamed
Patience Mthunzi-Kufa
Tolullah Oni
Noelle Selin
Bettina Speckmann
Raissa D’Souza
Erick Tambo
Dacheng Tao
Nguyen TK Thanh
Jenny Y. Yang
Princess Sumaya bint Hassan (Advisory Board)
Bruce Alberts (Advisory Board)
Howard Alper (Advisory Board)
 (Advisory Board)
Helmut Schwarz (Advisory Board)

References

External links

International academies